Kuhdasht County is in Lorestan province, Iran. The capital of the county is the city of Kuhdasht. At the 2006 census, the county's population was 209,821 in 43,159 households. The following census in 2011 counted 218,921 people in 52,799 households. At the 2016 census, the county's population was 166,658 in 45,155 households, by which time Rumeshkhan District had been separated from the county to become Rumeshkhan County.

Administrative divisions

The population history and structural changes of Kuhdasht County's administrative divisions over three consecutive censuses are shown in the following table. The latest census shows four districts, nine rural districts, and four cities.

References

 

Counties of Lorestan Province